Sonja Records was a Los Angeles-based record label founded by musician Ike Turner in 1963. Turner set up the label to release singles from the Ike & Tina Turner Revue, which included his then wife, R&B singer Tina Turner, as well as other artists he was producing. Tina Turner's first record as a solo artist was released on Sonja Records in 1964.

In the Northeast, Sonja was distributed by Superior Record Sales Company, Inc. in New York, and Schwartz Brothers Inc. in the Washington, Baltimore and Philadelphia markets. In the Midwest, Concord Record Sales in Cleveland and All State Record Distributing Company in Chicago. On the West Coast, California Records in Los Angeles.

Discography

See also 

 Innis Records
 Teena Records
 Sony Records
 Prann Records
 List of record labels

References 

American record labels
Rhythm and blues record labels
Pop record labels
Ike Turner
Record labels established in 1963
Record labels disestablished in 1964
Vanity record labels
Record labels based in California
Defunct record labels of the United States